The year 1997 was regarded as one of the most intense tropical cyclone years on record, featuring a record 12 category 5-equivalent tropical cyclones, according to the Saffir–Simpson hurricane wind scale. The year also featured the second-highest amount of accumulated cyclone energy (ACE) on record, just behind 1992 and 2018. Throughout the year, 108 tropical cyclones have developed in bodies of water, commonly known as tropical cyclone basins. However, only 89 tropical cyclones were of those attaining 39 mph or greater, falling just below the long term average of 102 named systems. The most active basin was the Western Pacific, attaining an ACE amount of 571, the highest ever recorded in any season in any basin on record. The deadliest tropical cyclone was Severe Tropical Storm Linda (Openg). The costliest tropical cyclone was Super Typhoon Winnie (Ibiang), which set a record for having the largest eye on record. The most intense tropical cyclone was Hurricane Linda, peaking at 902 hPa/mbar. Typhoon Paka (Rubing), the longest-lived system, produced the third-highest ACE for a single tropical cyclone, just behind Typhoon Nancy (1961) and Hurricane/Typhoon Ioke (2006).

Tropical cyclones are primarily monitored by a group of ten warning centres, which have been designated as a Regional Specialized Meteorological Center (RSMC) or a Tropical Cyclone Warning Center (TCWC) by the World Meteorological Organization. These are the United States National Hurricane Center (NHC) and Central Pacific Hurricane Center, the Japan Meteorological Agency (JMA), the India Meteorological Department (IMD), Météo-France, Indonesia's Badan Meteorologi, Klimatologi, dan Geofisika, the Australian Bureau of Meteorology (BOM), Papua New Guinea's National Weather Service, the Fiji Meteorological Service (FMS) as well as New Zealand's MetService. Other notable warning centres include the Philippine Atmospheric, Geophysical and Astronomical Services Administration (PAGASA), the United States Joint Typhoon Warning Center (JTWC), and the Brazilian Navy Hydrographic Center.

Global conditions 

In January 1997, satellites gathering information on water temperatures and sea level heights discovered an area of unusually warm water situated across the western half of the Pacific Ocean. By this time, the Scripps Institution of Oceanography had forecast that an ENSO was likely to take place during the latter half of 1997. Throughout February, water temperatures began increasing over much of the Pacific as well as in shallower waters off the coast of Peru. At the surface off the coast of Peru, water temperatures averaged 3 °C (5.4 °F) above normal.

Exceedingly warm waters became apparent by May, especially off the coast of South America where anomalies were reaching 7 °C (12.6 °F) above normal. Further north, sea surface temperatures along the Pacific coast of North America were increasing, with a large pool of water being 3 °C (5.4 °F) above normal. By September 1997, the ENSO became very powerful, with surface temperatures between South America and the International Date Line averaging 2–4 °C (3.6–7.2 °F) above normal, roughly a quarter of the planet's diameter. Additionally, waters along the Pacific coast of North America continued to expand, now stretching from Alaska to southern Mexico. Along the Pacific coast of the Americas, the volume of  water was roughly 30 times greater than that of all the water in the Great Lakes combined. The extra heat energy created by this anomaly was also about 93 times more than the energy produced by fossil fuels in the United States during 1995.

Summary

Systems

January

February

March

April

May

June

July

August

September

October

November

December

Global effects 
There are a total of 9 tropical cyclone basins, 7 are seasonal and two are non-seasonal, thus all 8 basins except the Mediterranean are active. In this table, data from all these basins are added.

See also 

 Tropical cyclones by year
 List of earthquakes in 1997
 Tornadoes of 1997

References

External links

Regional Specialized Meteorological Centers
 US National Hurricane Center – North Atlantic, Eastern Pacific
 Central Pacific Hurricane Center – Central Pacific
 Japan Meteorological Agency – NW Pacific
 India Meteorological Department – Bay of Bengal and the Arabian Sea
 Météo-France – La Reunion – South Indian Ocean from 30°E to 90°E
 Fiji Meteorological Service – South Pacific west of 160°E, north of 25° S

Tropical Cyclone Warning Centers
 Meteorology, Climatology, and Geophysical Agency of Indonesia – South Indian Ocean from 90°E to 141°E, generally north of 10°S
 Australian Bureau of Meteorology (TCWC's Perth, Darwin & Brisbane) – South Indian Ocean & South Pacific Ocean from 90°E to 160°E, generally south of 10°S
 Papua New Guinea National Weather Service – South Pacific Ocean from 141°E to 160°E, generally north of 10°S
 Meteorological Service of New Zealand Limited – South Pacific west of 160°E, south of 25°S

Tropical cyclones by year
1997 Atlantic hurricane season
1997 Pacific hurricane season
1997 Pacific typhoon season
1997 North Indian Ocean cyclone season
1996–97 Australian region cyclone season
1997–98 Australian region cyclone season
1996–97 South Pacific cyclone season
1997–98 South Pacific cyclone season
1996–97 South-West Indian Ocean cyclone season
1997–98 South-West Indian Ocean cyclone season
1997-related lists